The Poclușa is a left tributary of the Crișul Negru in western Romania. It flows into the Crișul Negru near Șoimi.

References

Rivers of Romania
Rivers of Bihor County